Casearia seethalakshmiae is a species in the family Salicaceae, and is confined to Palakkad, Kerala. It is named after Dr.Seethalakshmi who was a scientist in Kerala Forest Research Institute.

Description 
The species grows as a small shrub with greenish yellow flowers.

References 

seethalakshmiae
Plants described in 2022